The second government of José Antonio Griñán was formed on 7 May 2012 following the latter's election as President of Andalusia by the Parliament of Andalusia on 3 May and his swearing-in on 5 May, as a result of the Socialist Party of Andalusia (PSOE–A) and United Left (IULV–CA) being able to muster a majority of seats in Parliament following the 2012 Andalusian regional election, despite the People's Party (PP) emerging as the largest parliamentary force.

The cabinet comprised members of the PSOE–A (including one independent) and IULV–CA, to become the third coalition government ever in Andalusia and the first one comprising IU members. It was automatically dismissed on 27 August 2013 as a consequence of Griñán's resignation as president, but remained in acting capacity until the next government was sworn in.

Investiture

Council of Government
The Council of Government was structured into the offices for the president, the vice president and 11 ministries.

Notes

References

2012 establishments in Andalusia
2013 disestablishments in Andalusia
Cabinets established in 2012
Cabinets disestablished in 2013
Cabinets of Andalusia